George Prosser may refer to:

 George Henry Prosser (1867–1941), businessman and politician in South Australia
 George Walter Prosser, British Army officer